St Dogmells was a rural district in the administrative county of Pembrokeshire, Wales from 1894 to 1934.

Formation
The district was created by the Local Government Act 1894 from the part of Cardigan Rural Sanitary District in Pembrokeshire, and consisted of seventeen civil parishes (see below).  It continued to be administered from Cardigan.

List of Parishes:

Purpose
The Council comprised councillors and a chairman, and its responsibilities included sanitary services, sewerage, refuse collection, maintaining local roads, cemeteries and parks, licensing of public entertainments, water supply and housing. It became a rating authority in 1925. Rural District Councils were administered by a number of committees and by appointed officers including a Clerk, Treasurer, Public Health Inspector, Housing Officer, Surveyor and Rating Officer.

Abolition
It was abolished in 1934, when a county review order amalgamated it with Llanfyrnach RD to form Cemaes RD (which itself was abolished in 1974 following local government reorganisation and its functions were assumed by Preseli Pembrokeshire District Council).

Records
The records of the council are held by Pembrokeshire Record Office in Haverfordwest.

References

External links

Rural districts of Wales
History of Pembrokeshire